Nainima is a Fijian surname. Notable people with the surname include:

Annette Nainima (born 1997), Fijian footballer
Valerie Nainima (born 1986), Fijian basketball player

Fijian-language surnames
Surnames of Fijian origin